The Saratoga News is a local paper covering the city of Saratoga, California, in Santa Clara county. Published weekly on Tuesday, it has an estimated circulation of 13,240.

Ownership and history 

The Saratoga News was founded in 1955 by Sherman and Wilma M. Miller.

The paper was sold in 1973 to Suburban Newspaper Publishers Association group in Cupertino, headed by Mort Levine. It was sold again to the Meredith Corporation in 1978, then to ex-Meredith executive Terrence T. Donnelly and later to the Peninsula Times Tribune subsidiary of the Tribune Newspaper Company.

In 1990, Metro Newspapers purchased the Saratoga News along with Los Gatos Times-Observer and Los Gatos Weekly, the latter of which had been founded by Metro CEO Dan Pulcrano in 1982. Under Metro, the Saratoga News enjoyed a decade-long run, its longest period of local ownership other than that of the Millers. The community newspaper group adopted the name Silicon Valley Community Newspapers and purchased or started weeklies in Cupertino, Sunnyvale, Campbell and the Willow Glen district of San Jose. In 2001, Metro executive David Cohen  purchased the Saratoga News as part of a management buyout of the community newspaper group.

In 2005, Knight Ridder purchased the Saratoga News as part of its acquisition of the Silicon Valley Community Newspapers. In 2006, Knight Ridder was purchased by McClatchy Co., which immediately sold SVCN and the San Jose Mercury News to MediaNews Group. MediaNews Group is now known as Digital First Media. Silicon Valley Community Newspapers and the Saratoga News are published as part of the San Jose Mercury News. As part of its merger with San Jose Mercury News, Saratoga News is offered as part of a subscription model, rather than as a free weekly paper.

The paper is currently published by the Bay Area News Group, which is owned by Digital First Media.

Awards 

In 2005, Lisa Toth from the Saratoga News won 2nd place for Continuing Coverage from the San Francisco Peninsula Press Club.

In 2011, Dick Sparrer took 1st place for Sports Game Story from the San Francisco Peninsula Press Club.

In 2010, the Saratoga News won 12 awards from the San Francisco Peninsula Press Club and 5 awards from the California Teachers Association for education-related coverage.

In 2009, the Saratoga News took 1st place in General Excellence from the San Francisco Peninsula Press Club. Marianne L. Hamilton also won 3rd place for Business Story.

In 2008, Marianne L. Hamilton won 1st place for Feature Story of Light Nature, 1st place for Specialty Story, and 3rd place for Feature Story of Serious Nature from the San Francisco Peninsula Press Club. Dick Sparrer took 1st place for Sports Game Story at that same awards ceremony.

References 

Weekly newspapers published in California
MediaNews Group publications
Newspapers established in 1955
Saratoga, California
1955 establishments in California